This is a list of cemeteries in Budapest, Hungary. The most famous of them is Kerepesi Cemetery, one of the biggest national pantheons in Europe, where several Hungarian notables are buried in ornate monuments. The second most significant may be Farkasréti Cemetery, including the graves of further illustrious people.

The largest cemetery in Budapest (and one of the largest ones in Europe) is Új köztemető (New Public Cemetery); it comprises an area of about 2.07 km².

 Angeli Street Cemetery
 Budafoki Cemetery
 Cinkotai Cemetery
 Csepeli Cemetery
 Csörsz Street Cemetery (Orthodox Jewish cemetery, out of use since 1961)
 Farkasréti Cemetery
 Gránátos Street Cemetery (Orthodox Jewish cemetery)
 Kerepesi Cemetery (Kerepesi temető; official name: Fiumei úti sírkert)
 Kispesti Cemetery
 Kozma Street Cemetery (the biggest Jewish cemetery in Hungary, with the monument of 600,000 Jewish martyrs, famous for its art nouveau memorials)
 New Public Cemetery, Budapest (Új köztemető; Rákoskeresztúri sírkert)
 Óbuda Jewish Cemetery
 Óbudai Cemetery
 Pestszenterzsébeti Cemetery
 Pestszentlőrinci Cemetery
 Rákospalotai Cemetery
 Salgotarjani Street Jewish Cemetery
 Tamás Street Urn Cemetery
 Újpest, Megyeri Cemetery

External links
 Budapest Funeral Institute, cemeteries

Cemeteries in Budapest
Religion in Budapest
Cemeteries